Cone Glacier Volcano is a cinder cone in the Boundary Ranges of the Coast Mountains in northwestern British Columbia, Canada. It is part of the Iskut-Unuk River Cones group and last erupted during the Holocene period. Cone Glacier contains two arms that surround the volcano.

See also
List of volcanoes in Canada
List of Northern Cordilleran volcanoes
Volcanic history of the Northern Cordilleran Volcanic Province
Volcanism of Canada
Volcanism of Western Canada

References

Northern Cordilleran Volcanic Province
Cinder cones of British Columbia